Daniel Soares Brites (born 9 November 1992) is a Portuguese footballer who plays for Swiss club Stade Nyonnais on loan from Servette FC, as a forward.

External links 
 Stats at Swiss Football league site
 Profile at Servette FC

1992 births
Living people
Portuguese footballers
Association football forwards
Swiss Super League players
Servette FC players